Aghaat (English: Harm) is a 1985 Bollywood film directed by Govind Nihalani and produced by Manmohan Shetty under the banner of Neo Films Association. It stars Om Puri, Naseeruddin Shah and Bharath Gopi in lead roles while Amrish Puri, Pankaj Kapur and Deepa Sahi and Sarika are in supporting roles.

Plot
Madhav Verma (Om Puri) is a dedicated, honest, and diligent union representative. He represents the majority of the employees in an organization, which recognizes his union. However, there is a rival in the shape and form of Rustom Patel (Naseeruddin Shah) who is attempting to break the union so as to establish his majority, through his henchman Krishnan (Gopi), and will not hesitate to stoop to any level to get what he wants. Chhotelal (Pankaj Kapoor) loses his legs in an accident, and must be hospitalized. Krishnan takes advantage of the situation and puts pressure on Chhotelal and his brothers (Achyut Potdar and Harish Patel) to enroll in his union, and he will get him a higher compensation package than his regular union. Madhav must use his utmost diligence and consistently uphold his principles as they will be put to a test before all logic gives way to violence, anarchy, apathy, and corruption.

Cast
Bharath Gopi — Krishnan Raju
Om Puri — Madhav Verma
Sadashiv Amrapurkar — VP Sarnaik
K K Raina — Paranjpe
 M K Raina — Dubey
Rohini Hattangadi — Mrs. Ali, Social Worker
Pankaj Kapur — Chotelal
Naseeruddin Shah — Rustom Patel
Deepa Sahi — Chotelal's wife
Amrish Puri — Chakradev
Harish Patel — Chotelal brother
Achyut Potdar — Chotelal's elder brother

References

External links 
 

1980s Hindi-language films
1985 films
Films directed by Govind Nihalani